Emma Nanny Charlotte Kullberg (born 25 September 1991) is a Swedish professional footballer who plays as a defender for Brighton & Hove Albion of the English FA Women's Super League. She previously played for the Damallsvenskan team BK Häcken. Kullberg made her debut for the Sweden women's national football team in November 2019 and won a silver medal with the team at the 2020 Summer Olympics.

Club career
Kullberg transferred to Kopparbergs/Göteborg FC in October 2019, after a successful 2019 season with KIF Örebro DFF in which she played in all 22 Damallsvenskan matches and broke into the national team.

In January 2022 she joined FA Women's Super League club Brighton & Hove Albion. She signed an 18-month contract in a double transfer with team mate Julia Zigiotti Olme.

International career
On 7 November 2019 Kullberg made her senior Sweden debut, in a 3–2 friendly defeat by the United States in Columbus, Ohio.

Kullberg was selected in Sweden's 2020 Summer Olympics squad, appearing as a late substitute in the final as Sweden lost to Canada on penalties.

Private life 
Kullberg lives together with Swedish footballer Julia Zigiotti Olme in a same-sex relationship.

References

External links

 
 
 
 

1991 births
Living people
Sportspeople from Umeå
Swedish women's footballers
Sweden women's international footballers
Damallsvenskan players
Women's association football defenders
BK Häcken FF players
Umeå IK players
KIF Örebro DFF players
Vittsjö GIK players
Footballers at the 2020 Summer Olympics
Olympic footballers of Sweden
Olympic medalists in football
Medalists at the 2020 Summer Olympics
Olympic silver medalists for Sweden
Brighton & Hove Albion W.F.C. players
Women's Super League players
Expatriate women's footballers in England
Swedish expatriate sportspeople in England
Swedish expatriate women's footballers
UEFA Women's Euro 2022 players
Swedish LGBT sportspeople
LGBT association football players
Lesbian sportswomen
21st-century LGBT people